Shelter Cave is an archaeological and paleontological site located in Doña Ana County, New Mexico.

Description

The site is a rock shelter well up on the western side of Bishop's Cap, an outlier of the Organ Mountains. It lies about 450 ft below the summit according to Brattstrom (1964); this would make its elevation about 1500 m. It was originally excavated by the Los Angeles County Museum (LACM) c. 1929 (LACMVP site number 1010). Specimens collected from talus, fill, or other areas are labeled 1010 Dump or 1010D. Specimens collected by Conkling are labeled C 1010. The shelter was excavated in 5-foot sections.

Brattstrom (1964) had access to the original field notes. Two profiles were given. One in Sec. S-5-7, from bottom to top: rock bottom of the shelter, 5" angular fragments, 8" smooth concretionary limestone fragments mixed with brown dust, 6" of ash mixed with angular fragments, 10" of layered gray (volcanic?) ash grading into a layer of brown, 4" of hard burned guano, 4" of unconsolidated bat guano, top. Most bones were found in brown and gray ash. Another section 53" thick, from bottom up: floor of the shelter, 17" of broken concretionary limestone fragments, 16" of brown ash, 12" of gray layered ash grading into the brown below it, 8" of bat guano, top.

Brattstrom (1964:95) gives several quotes from the original field notes: Sloth in place, S-5-4 in upper guano layer and in direct association with bits of knots of vegetative material.  S-6-5, sloth bone in upper yellow layer.  Mummified rat and snake on top of rocks in bat guano. S-5-6, S-5-5, horse jaws in brown ash. S-5-6, sloth skull fragment in gray ash below overhanging rock.  In same section above rock was an Indian grindstone.  S-4-7, beads and sandal found beneath guano layer and also below overhanging rock.  S-4-9, badger and deer skulls in gray ash.

Age
Rancholabrean (late Pleistocene) and Holocene. One date on sloth dung (Van Devender and Spaulding 1979) of 11,330 ± 370 BP (Before Present). Material has continued to accumulate up to the present. Thompson et al. (1980) list three dates for sloth dung, including that above; the others are 12,330 ± 190 and 12,430 ± 250. They also list dates on desert tortoise (Gopherus agassizii) scutes and bone (11,280 to 12,520) and dates for middens of packrats in the shelter (11,850 to 31,250).

Comments
Fosberg (1936) lists plants identified from Shelter Cave deposits, but without provenance data; they likely are Holocene. He also mentions that there are coprolites of either sloth or horse. Thompson et al. (1980) point out that vegetation from pre-full-glacial middens from the shelter are more mesic than the terminal Pleistocene ones that lack oak, and pinyon pine is rare.

This is the type locality of Stockoceros conklingi (Conkling's pronghorn).

The faunal list includes one or more citations for each taxon. UTEP indicates specimens are deposited in the Resource Collections of the Laboratory for Environmental Biology, Centennial Museum and Chihuahuan Desert Gardens, University of Texas at El Paso.

The Los Angeles County Museum has a large collection from Shelter Cave, including the type of Stockoceros conklingi.  Most of the material has yet to be studied.

Fauna

AMPHIBIA
 Scaphiopus cf. couchii Brattstrom 1964
 Rana cf. pipiens Brattstrom 1964

REPTILIA
 Gopherus agassizii Brattstrom 1961, 1964; Van Devender et al. 1976; UTEP
 Eumeces obsoletus Brattstrom 1964
 Phrynosoma cornutum Brattstrom 1964
 Crotaphytus collaris Brattstrom 1964
 Coluber constrictor Brattstrom 1964
 Masticophis flagellum Brattstrom 1964
 Lampropeltis getula Brattstrom 1964
 Pituophis melanoleucus Brattstrom 1964
 Elaphe subocularis Brattstrom 1964
 Trimorphodon biscutatus UTEP
 Crotalus atrox Brattstrom 1964

AVES
 Anser ? albifrons Howard and Miller 1933
 Anas acuta Howard and Miller 1933
 Anas crecca Howard and Miller 1933
 Cathartes aura Howard and Miller 1933
 Breagyps clarki Howard 1971 (Specimen reported as Gymnogyps californianus by Howard and Miller 1933)
 Accipiter striatus Howard and Miller 1933
 Buteo jamaicensis Howard and Miller 1933
 Buteo swainsoni Howard and Miller 1933
 Buteo ? albonotatus Howard and Miller 1933
 Buteogallus fragilis Howard and Miller 1933
 Aquila chrysaetos Howard and Miller 1933
 Polyborus plancus prelutosus Howard and Miller 1933
 Falco peregrinus Howard and Miller 1933
 Falco sparverius Howard and Miller 1933
 Centrocercus urophasianus Howard and Miller 1933
 Meleagris crassipes Rea 1980
 Callipepla squamata Howard and Miller 1933
 Lophortyx sp. Howard and Miller 1933
 Oreortyx pictus Harris 1985; Howard and Miller 1933
 Porzana carolina Howard and Miller 1933
 Fulica americana Howard and Miller 1933
 Larus sp. Howard and Miller 1933
 Zenaida macroura Howard and Miller 1933
 Geococcyx californianus conklingi Harris and Crews 1983; Howard and Miller 1933
 Geococcyx californianus californianus Harris 1985; Howard and Miller 1933
 Tyto alba Howard and Miller 1933
 Otus asio Howard and Miller 1933
 Bubo virginianus Howard and Miller 1933
 Athene cunicularia Howard and Miller 1933
 Aegolius funereus Howard and Miller 1933
 Aegolius acadicus Howard and Miller 1933
 Aeronautes saxatalis Howard and Miller 1933
 Colaptes auratus Howard and Miller 1933
 Melanerpes formicivorus Howard and Miller 1933
 Sayornis saya Howard and Miller 1933
 Eremophila alpestris Howard and Miller 1933
 Pica pica Howard and Miller 1933
 Corvus corax Howard and Miller 1933
 Gymnorhinus cyanocephalus Howard and Miller 1933
 Catherpes mexicanus Howard and Miller 1933
 Salpinctes obsoletus Howard and Miller 1933
 Turdus migratorius Howard and Miller 1933
 Sialia sp. Howard and Miller 1933
 Toxostoma sp. Howard and Miller 1933
 Oreoscoptes montanus Howard and Miller 1933
 Lanius ludovicianus Howard and Miller 1933
 Molothrus ater Howard and Miller 1933
 Pyelorhamphus molothroides Howard and Miller 1933
 Carpodacus mexicanus Howard and Miller 1933
 Pipilo erythrophthalmus Howard and Miller 1933
 Pipilo fuscus Howard and Miller 1933
 Calamospiza melanocorys Howard and Miller 1933
 Amphispiza bilineata — very recently entombed according to Howard and Miller 1933.

MAMMALIA
 Notiosorex crawfordi Harris 1985
 Nothrotheriops shastensis Harris 1985
 Lepus californicus UTEP
 ? Geomyidae Harris 1985
 Neotoma cinerea Harris 1985; UTEP
 Microtus cf. montanus Smartt 1977; UTEP
 Canis latrans Harris 1985
 Urocyon/Vulpes Harris 1985
 Taxidea taxus Harris 1985
 Spilogale sp. Harris 1985 as Spilogale putorius
 Mephitis mephitis Harris 1985
 Lynx rufus Harris 1985
 Equus sp. (large) Harris 1985
 Equus sp. (small) Harris 1985; UTEP
 Camelops sp. Stock 1932a
 Odocoileus sp. Harris 1985
 Stockoceros conklingi Stock 1930
 Capromeryx sp. Harris 1985
 Ovis canadensis Harris 1985

References
Brattstrom, B. H. 1964. Amphibians and reptiles from cave deposits in south-central New Mexico. Bulletin of the Southern California Academy of Sciences 63:93-103.
Fosberg, F. R. 1936. Plant remains in Shelter Cave, New Mexico. Bulletin of the Southern California Academy of Sciences 35:154-155.
Harris, A. H. 1977. Wisconsin age environments in the northern Chihuahuan Desert: Evidence from the higher vertebrates. pp. 23–52, in Transactions of the symposium on the biological resources of the Chihuahuan Desert region, United States and Mexico (R. H. Wauer and D. H. Riskind, eds.), Natl. Park Serv. Trans. Proceedings Series 3:1-658.
Harris, A. H. 1985. Late Pleistocene vertebrate paleoecology of the West. University of Texas Press, Austin, 293 pp.
Harris, A. H., and C. R. Crews. 1983. Conkling's roadrunner—a subspecies of the California roadrunner? Southwestern Naturalist 28:407-412.
Howard, H. 1971. Quaternary avian remains from Dark Canyon Cave, New Mexico. Condor, 73:237-240.
Howard, H., and A. H. Miller. 1933. Bird remains from cave deposits in New Mexico. Condor 35:15-18.
Rea, A. M. 1980. Late Pleistocene and Holocene turkeys in the Southwest. Contributions in Science, Natural History Museum of Los Angeles County 330:209-224.
Smartt, R. A. 1977. The ecology of Late Pleistocene and Recent Microtus from south-central and southwestern New Mexico. Southwestern Naturalist 22:1-19.
Stock, C. 1930. Quaternary antelope remains from a second cave deposit in the Organ Mountains, New Mexico. Los Angeles Museum, Science series, Paleontology 2:1-18.
Stock, C. 1932. A further study of the Quaternary antelopes of Shelter Cave, New Mexico. Los Angeles Museum, Science series, Paleontology 3:1-45, 3 pls.
Thompson, R. S., T. R. Van Devender, P. S. Martin, T. Foppe, and A. Long. 1980. Shasta ground sloth (Nothrotheriops shastense Hoffstetter) at Shelter Cave, New Mexico: Environment, diet, and extinction. Quaternary Research 14:360-376.

Archaeological sites in New Mexico
Caves of New Mexico
Landforms of Doña Ana County, New Mexico
Rock shelters in the United States
Organ Mountains–Desert Peaks National Monument